Dolobran may refer to:

Dolobran, Montgomeryshire, historic estate of the Lloyd family
Dolobran (Haverford, Pennsylvania), 1881 shingle-style mansion and estate
Dolobran II, original name of the Gladwyne, Pennsylvania mansion and estate "Linden Hill"